The 1928 Württemberg state election was held on 20 May 1928 to elect the 80 members of the Landtag of the Free People's State of Württemberg.

Results 

On 6 June 1929, the Württemberg state court declared the provisions of the electoral law on seat distribution unconstitutional and seats were redistributed as follows:

References 

1928 elections in Germany
1928
May 1928 events